Myanglung Campus or Myanglung college, a community campus, is a college situated at the heart of Myanglung Municipality of Terhathum District in the eastern development region of Nepal on the lap of the Himalayas. Myanglung Campus provides higher secondary, Bachelor, and Master level education.

Courses offered 

 Bachelor of Arts (BA)
 Bachelor of Business Studies (BBS)
 Bachelor of Education (B.Ed.)
 MA Nepali
 Master of Education (M.Ed.) General
 10+2 Education
 10+2 Management

References

External links

Tribhuvan University
Universities and colleges in Nepal
1981 establishments in Nepal
Buildings and structures in Tehrathum District